Tauca District is one of eleven districts of the Pallasca Province in Peru.

References

Districts of the Pallasca Province
Districts of the Ancash Region